The 1998 AT&T Challenge was a men's tennis tournament played on clay in Atlanta, United States that was part of the International Series of the 1998 ATP Tour. It was the thirteenth edition of the tournament and was held from 27 April – 3 May 1998.

Seeds
Champion seeds are indicated in bold text while text in italics indicates the round in which those seeds were eliminated.

Draw

Finals

Top half

Bottom half

References

External links
 Main draw

Singles
1998 Singles